The Marquesas Islands were colonized by seafaring Polynesians as early as 300 AD, thought to originate from Samoa.  The dense population was concentrated in the narrow valleys and consisted of warring tribes.

Much of Polynesia, including the original settlers of Hawaii, Tahiti, Rapa Iti and Easter Island, was settled by Marquesans, believed to have departed from the Marquesas as a result more frequently of overpopulation and drought-related food shortages, than because of the nearly constant warfare that eventually became a prominent feature of the islands' culture.  Almost the entire remainder of Polynesia, with the exception of a few areas of western Polynesia as well as the majority of the Polynesian outliers, was colonized by Marquesan descendants centered in Tahiti.

Culture

1595–1945
Native Marquesan culture was devastated in the period following the arrival of European explorers.  The primary cause of its collapse can be directly linked to the catastrophic effects of alien diseases, especially smallpox, which reduced the population by an estimated 98%.

It is worth noting that the sexual culture of Marquesans is often misrepresented. Robert Louis Stevenson, who visited the islands and talked to the natives, wrote:  (The conflicting reports mentioned here are compactly summarized by Robert Carl Suggs.)

Tatu

The Marquesas have a long history of complex geometric tattooing, covering the whole bodies of both men and women.

Marquesan tattoos can be recognized by 'trademark symbols', such as geckos, centipedes, Ti'i's, the Marquesan Cross (which is also commonly confused with other designs) and other geometric designs. Marquesan designs distinguish themselves through the use of symbols and consistent artistic renderings of lines, arches and circles, which are uniquely attributed and linked through history to the South Pacific Islands.

Boys received their first tattoos in their teens in a ritual setting, and by old age often had tattoos all over their bodies. Women were also tattooed, but not as extensively as men. The designs share many symbolic motifs, but were never copied entirely; every individual's tattoos were different and signified heritage, accomplishments, the specific Marquesan island the individual came from and their familial position.

Contemporary period
Today, Marquesan culture is a mélange created by the layering of the ancient Marquesan culture, with strong influences from the important Tahitian culture and the politically important French culture.

In western culture
Famous French painter Paul Gauguin and Belgian singer Jacques Brel spent the last years of their lives in the Marquesas, and are buried there. Brel composed a famous song, Les Marquises, about the Marquesas Islands, his last home.
The Marquesas provided inspiration to American novelist Herman Melville, whose experiences in the Marquesas formed the basis for his novel Typee.
Robert Louis Stevenson visited the Marquesas in 1888, and wrote about his experiences and impressions there in 1900, in a book called In the South Seas.  
Thor Heyerdahl wrote his book Fatu Hiva during a year-long stay on that island.
The island group is also mentioned in passing in the Crosby, Stills & Nash song, "Southern Cross".
The Marquesas Islands temporarily received an international spotlight in the United States when the reality TV show Survivor: Marquesas was filmed there. It was the fourth installment of the TV series Survivor.

See also
Marquesan language
Wood carving in the Marquesas Islands

References

Further reading

External links 
The Marquesas Islands, at the Polynesian Cultural Center

Marquesan culture
Sexuality and age
Cannibalism in Oceania
Polynesian tattooing